Viktor Lyoskin (27 October 1953 – 2002) was a Russian speed skater. He competed at the 1980 Winter Olympics in the 5000 m and 10000 m and finished in 11th and 7th place, respectively. On 3 April 1977 he set a new world record in the 10,000 m at the high-altitude rink of Medeo.

Personal bests: 
500 m – 39.2 (1979)
1000 m – 1:19.60 (1977)
1500 m – 1:57.26 (1980)
 5000 m – 7:02.10 (1980)
 10000 m – 14:34.33 (1977)

References

External links

Viktor Lyoskin at speedskatingstats.com
Biography of Viktor Lyoskin 

1953 births
2002 deaths
Olympic speed skaters of the Soviet Union
Speed skaters at the 1980 Winter Olympics
Russian male speed skaters
Soviet male speed skaters
Sportspeople from Nizhny Novgorod